Pristimantis rubicundus is a species of frog in the family Strabomantidae.
It is endemic to Ecuador.
Its natural habitat is tropical moist montane forest.
It is threatened by habitat loss.

References

rubicundus
Amphibians of Ecuador
Endemic fauna of Ecuador
Taxa named by Marcos Jiménez de la Espada
Amphibians described in 1875
Taxonomy articles created by Polbot